Sergeant X (French: Sergent X) is a 1960 French drama film directed by Bernard Borderie and starring Noëlle Adam, Christian Marquand and Paul Guers. It is a remake of the 1932 film of the same title. It was made in the style of a traditional Foreign Legion film with little acknowledgement of the ongoing Algerian War.

The film's sets were designed by the art director René Moulaert.

Synopsis
After becoming involved in a track accident in North Africa, a former paratrooper returns home to find his girlfriend believes him dead and 
has married another man. He enlists in the French Foreign Legion.

Cast
 Noëlle Adam as Françoise Renaud
 Christian Marquand as Michel Rousseau
 Paul Guers as Henri Mangin
 Guy Mairesse as Serge
 Renaud Mary as Capt. Robert
 Lutz Gabor as Willy
 Daniel Cauchy as Fred
 Yves Barsacq as Le médecin

References

Bibliography 
 Bedjaoui, Ahmed. Cinema and the Algerian War of Independence: Culture, Politics, and Society. Springer Nature, 2020.

External links 
 

1960 films
French drama films
1960 drama films
1960s French-language films
Films directed by Bernard Borderie
Remakes of French films
Films about the French Foreign Legion
1960s French films